Great Barrier Island lies in the outer Hauraki Gulf, New Zealand,  north-east of central Auckland. With an area of  it is the sixth-largest island of New Zealand and fourth-largest in the main chain. The local authority is the Auckland Council.

The island was initially exploited for its minerals and kauri trees and saw only limited agriculture. In 2013, it was inhabited by 939 people, mostly living from farming and tourism and all living off-the-grid. The majority of the island (around 60% of the total area) is administered as a nature reserve by the Department of Conservation. The island atmosphere is sometimes described as being "life in New Zealand many decades back".

Etymology
The Māori name of the island is Aotea. It received its English name from Captain Cook because it acts as a barrier between the Pacific Ocean and the Hauraki Gulf. Entrance to the Hauraki Gulf is via two channels, one on each side of the island. Colville Channel separates the southernmost point, Cape Barrier, from Cape Colville at the northern tip of the Coromandel Peninsula to the south, Cradock Channel from the smaller Little Barrier Island to the west. The island protects the Hauraki Gulf from the ocean surface waves and the currents of the South Pacific Gyre. It is not a sandbar barrier, often defined as the correct use of the term. The island's English name stems from its location on the outskirts of the Hauraki Gulf.

Geography

Great Barrier is surrounded by several smaller islands, including Kaikoura Island, Rakitu Island, Aiguilles Island and Dragon Island. A number of islands are located in Great Barrier bays, including Motukahu Island, Nelson Island, Kaikoura Island, Broken Islands, Motutaiko Island, Rangiahua Island, Little Mahuki Island, Mahuki Island and Junction Islands.

Consequently, the island boasts highly contrasting coastal environments. The eastern coast comprises long, sandy beaches, windswept sand-dunes, and at times heavy surf. The western coast, sheltered and calm, is home to hundreds of tiny, secluded bays which offer some of the best diving and boating in the country. The inland holds several large and biologically diverse wetlands, along with rugged hill country (bush or heath in the more exposed heights), as well as old-growth and regenerating kauri forests.

Geology and natural history

Much of Great Barrier Island is formed from remnants of volcanoes associated with the Coromandel Volcanic Zone. The North Great Barrier Volcano, which was centred to the north of the modern island from Whangapoua Bay northwards, formed through events between 18 and 17 million years ago; some of the earliest vulcanism which occurred in the zone. The Great Barrier Volcano formed to the west of the modern island between 15 and 12 million years ago. Much of the modern island is this volcano's eroded eastern flanks. The third volcano, Mount Hobson, is the caldera of a complex rhyolite dome volcano, which was active between 12 and 8 million years ago.

Approximately 17,000 years ago during the Last Glacial Maximum, the Hauraki Gulf was a low lying coastal plain as sea levels were over 100 metres lower than present day levels. During this period, Great Barrier Island was landlocked to the rest of the North Island, and bordered by the two major river systems that flowed on the plain.

History and culture

Great Barrier Island (Aotea) is the ancestral land of Ngāti Rehua Ngātiwai ki Aotea who are the tangata whenua (people of the land) and mana whenua (territorial land rights holders) of Aotea. Ngāti Rehua have occupied Aotea since the 17th century after conquering Aotea from people of Ngāti Manaia and Kawerau descent. In the mid-19th century during the early Colonial era of New Zealand, extensive private and crown land purchases meant only two areas of the Hauraki Gulf remained in Māori ownership: Te Huruhi (Surfdale) on Waiheke Island (2100 acres) on Waiheke and a 3,510 acre parcel of land at Katherine Bay on Great Barrier Island.

Local industries

Mining 
Early European interest followed discovery of copper in the remote north, where New Zealand's earliest mines were established at Miners Head in 1842. Traces of these mines remain, largely accessible only by boat. Later, gold and silver were found in the Okupu / Whangaparapara area in the 1890s, and the remains of a stamping battery on the Whangaparapara Road are a remainder of this time. The sound of the battery working was reputedly audible from the Coromandel Peninsula, 20 km away.

In early 2010, a government proposal to remove 705 ha of land on the Te Ahumatā Plateau (called "White Cliffs" by the locals) from Schedule 4 of the Crown Minerals Act, which gives protection from the mining of public land, was widely criticised. Concerns were that mining for the suspected $4.3 billion in mineral worth in the area would damage both the conservation land as well as the island's tourism economy. Locals were split on the project, some hoping for new jobs. If restarted, mining at White Cliffs would occur in the same area it originally proliferated on Great Barrier. The area's regenerating bushland still holds numerous semi-collapsed or open mining shafts where silver and gold had been mined.

Kauri logging

The kauri logging industry was profitable in early European days and up to the mid-20th century. Forests were well inland, with no easy way to get the logs to the sea or to sawmills. Kauri logs were dragged to a convenient stream bed with steep sides and a driving dam was constructed of wood, with a lifting gate near the bottom large enough for the logs to pass through. When the dam had filled, which might take up to a year, the gate was opened and the logs above the dam were pushed out through the hole and swept down to the sea. The logging industry cut down large amounts of old growth, and most of the current growth is younger native forest (around 150,000 kauri seedlings were planted by the New Zealand Forest Service in the 1970s and 1980s) as well as some remaining kauri in the far north of the island. Much of the island is covered with regenerating bush dominated by kanuka and kauri.

Other industries
Great Barrier Island was the site of New Zealand's last whaling station, at Whangaparapara, which opened in 1956, over a century after the whaling industry peaked in New Zealand, and closed due to depletion of whaling stocks and increasing protection of whales by 1962.

Another small-scale industry was kauri gum digging, while dairy farming and sheep farming have tended to play a small role compared to the usual New Zealand practice. A fishing industry collapsed when international fish prices dropped. Islanders are generally occupied in tourism, farming or service-related industries when not working off-island.

Shipwrecks

The remote north was the site of the sinking of the SS Wairarapa around midnight of 29 October 1894. This was one of New Zealand's worst shipwrecks, with about 140 lives lost, some of them buried in two beach grave sites in the far north. As a result, a Great Barrier Island pigeon post service was set up, the first message being flown on 14 May 1897. Special postage stamps were issued from October 1898 until 1908, when a new communications cable was laid to the mainland, which made the pigeon post redundant. Another major wreck lies in the far southeast, the SS Wiltshire.

Nature reserves
Over time, more and more of the island came under the stewardship of the Department of Conservation (DOC) or its predecessors. Partly this was land that had belonged to the Crown since the 1800s, while other parts were sold or donated like the more than 10% of the island (located in the northern bush area, with some of the largest remaining kauri forests) that was gifted to the Crown by farmer Max Burrill in 1984. DOC has created a large number of walking tracks through the island, some of which are also open for mountain biking. The Aotea Conservation Park has the only multi-day wilderness walk in the Auckland region, boasting two DOC huts and numerous campsites. The Park spreads over more than 12,000 hectares and offers multiple walking tracks for novice and experienced walkers.

The island is free of some of the more troublesome introduced pests that plague the native ecosystems of other parts of New Zealand. While it does have wild cats, dogs, feral pigs, black rats (R. rattus), Polynesian rats (R. exulans) and mice, there are no known populations of possums, mustelids (weasels, stoats or ferrets), hedgehogs, brown rats (R. norvegicus), deer or (since 2006) feral goats, thus being a relative haven for native bird and plant populations. Rare animals found on the island include brown teal ducks, black petrel seabirds and kaka parrots.

Marae

Great Barrier Island has two marae affiliated with the local iwi of Ngāti Rehua and Ngātiwai: the Kawa Marae and its Rehua meeting house, and Motairehe Marae and its Whakaruruhau meeting house.

In October 2020, the Government committed $313,007 from the Provincial Growth Fund to upgrade Kawa Marae, creating 6 jobs.

Dark Sky Sanctuary
In 2017, Aotea / Great Barrier Island was accredited as a Dark Sky Sanctuary by the International Dark-Sky Association.  This designation is given for sites in very remote locations to increase awareness of their dark sky characteristics and promote long term conservation.  At the time, it was the third International Dark Sky Sanctuary to be designated, and the first island sanctuary.

Population

Barrier Islands had a population of 930 at the 2018 New Zealand census, a decrease of 3 people (−0.3%) since the 2013 census, and an increase of 63 people (7.3%) since the 2006 census. There were 531 households, comprising 501 males and 429 females, giving a sex ratio of 1.17 males per female. The median age was 52.6 years (compared with 37.4 years nationally), with 138 people (14.8%) aged under 15 years, 90 (9.7%) aged 15 to 29, 477 (51.3%) aged 30 to 64, and 225 (24.2%) aged 65 or older.

Ethnicities were 91.3% European/Pākehā, 20.6% Māori, 2.6% Pacific peoples, 1.3% Asian, and 1.9% other ethnicities. Percentages may add up to more than 100% as people may identify with more than one ethnicity.

The percentage of people born overseas was 18.4, compared with 27.1% nationally.

Although some people chose not to answer the census's question about religious affiliation, 62.6% had no religion, 24.5% were Christian, 1.3% had Māori religious beliefs, 1.0% were Buddhist and 1.6% had other religions.

Of those at least 15 years old, 144 (18.2%) people had a bachelor's or higher degree, and 144 (18.2%) people had no formal qualifications. The median income was $21,300, compared with $31,800 nationally. 48 people (6.1%) earned over $70,000 compared to 17.2% nationally. The employment status of those at least 15 was that 279 (35.2%) people were employed full-time, 168 (21.2%) were part-time, and 57 (7.2%) were unemployed.

Settlements
The population lives mostly in coastal settlements. Tryphena, in Tryphena Harbour at the southern end, is the largest settlement. Other communities are Okupu and Whangaparapara in the south-west, Port Fitzroy and Okiwi in the north, and Claris and Medlands in the south-east. The population swells substantially from October to May. The island has become a favourite holiday destination in the darker months, due its superbly dark sky and the astrophotography and stargazing opportunities this offers. In 2017 the island was given Dark Sky Sanctuary status by the IDA. Its relative remoteness offers solitude, and the sustainable off-grid lifestyle of its inhabitants is something many visitors like to experience.

Without reticulated electricity, most houses use solar panels and a battery bank to generate and store power. Wind and water turbines and solar water heaters are also used. Diesel generators, which used to be the main power source, are now mostly used as back-up.

From the end of February 2007, the island was seen around the world as the setting for the BBC One reality show Castaway, which was filmed there for three months.

Transport
There are two airfields, Great Barrier Aerodrome at Claris and Okiwi Airfield. Barrier Air operate services from Auckland Airport and North Shore Aerodrome to Claris. Flight time is approximately 35 minutes from Auckland Airport. Barrier Air will also commence a service from Claris to Tauranga in December 2022. Sunair operates between Claris and Hamilton, Tauranga, Whangārei and Whitianga.

SeaLink operates a passenger, car and freight ferry. This ferry operates from Wynyard Wharf in Auckland city to Tryphena (several times weekly). Sailing time is approximately four and a half hours.

Other travel options: Barrier Express fast ferry from Sandspit or Auckland. Flight Hauraki, Christian Aviation, Auckland Seaplanes, Heletranz, Oceania Helicopters.

Civic institutions
Institutions and services are primarily provided by the Auckland Council, the local authority. Services and infrastructure like roads and the wharves at Tryphena and Whangaparapara are subsidised, with the island receiving about $4 in services for every $1 in rates. The Port FitzRoy wharf is owned by the North Barrier Residents and Ratepayers Association.

There are three primary schools: Mulberry Grove School at Tryphena, Kaitoke School at Claris, and Okiwi School. There is no secondary school, but there is a learning hub to assist students who learn through the New Zealand Correspondence School. Many children leave the island when they reach secondary school age to attend boarding school on the mainland. Previously, the lack of secondary schooling was cited as one of the reasons for a slow exodus of long-term resident families.

As part of Auckland the rules governing daily activities and applicable standards for civic works and services exists, shared with some of the other inhabited islands of the Hauraki Gulf. Driving rules are the same as for the rest of NZ and registration and a Warrant of Fitness are required for all vehicles. For example, every transport service operated solely on the island, the Chatham Islands, or Stewart Island/Rakiura is exempt from section 70C of the Transport Act 1962, the requirements for drivers to maintain driving-hours logbooks. Drivers subject to section 70B must nevertheless keep records of their driving hours in some form.

Rules governing dog control are the same as for Auckland. Dogs must be kept on a lead in all public places.

Notable residents
Fanny Osborne (1852–1934), artist
Jamison Gibson-Park, rugby union player

Paul Silva (1897–1974), soldier, timber worker, axeman and bridge builder

See also

Harataonga, a beach
List of islands of New Zealand

References

External links

 Articles/Stories of Great Barrier Island history, locals, issues, lifestyle
Photographs of Great Barrier Island held in Auckland Libraries' heritage collections

 The official visitors website for the island

 
Islands of the Auckland Region